Jacky Terrasson (born November 27, 1965) is a French jazz pianist and composer.

Background
Terrasson's mother is African-American from Georgia, and his father is French. From his parents he heard classical music as a child. He began piano lessons at an early age. He became interested in jazz when he heard his mother's albums of Miles Davis and Billie Holiday. Terrasson went to the Berklee College of Music in Boston for two semesters, then performed in clubs as a jazz pianist in Chicago and New York City. In 1993 he won the Thelonious Monk International Jazz Piano Competition. As the leader of a trio, Terrasson recorded his first solo album for Blue Note, then recorded with Jimmy Scott and Cassandra Wilson. He has worked with Stéphane Belmondo, Michael Brecker, Mino Cinélu, Ugonna Okegwo, Leon Parker, Michel Portal, Adam Rodgers, and Cécile McLorin Salvant. The Los Angeles Times heralds him as "a pianist with a shining improvisational imagination, Terrasson seems clearly determined to follow his own path."

Discography

As leader/co-leader 
 Moon and Sand with Tom Harrell (Jazz Aux Ramparts, 1991)
 Jacky Terrasson (Blue Note, 1994)
 Reach (Blue Note, 1995)
 Rendezvous with Cassandra Wilson (Blue Note, 1997)
 Alive (Blue Note, 1998) – live recorded in 1997
 What It Is (Blue Note, 1999) – recorded in 1998
 A Paris... (Blue Note, 2000)
 Kindred with Stefon Harris (Blue Note, 2001)
 Smile (Blue Note, 2002)
 Into the Blue with Emmanuel Pahud (Blue Note, 2003) – recorded in 2001
 Mirror (Blue Note, 2007) – recorded in 2006
 Push (Concord Jazz, 2010) – recorded in 2009
 Gouache (Universal, 2012)
 Take This (Impulse!, 2015) – recorded in 2014
 Mother with Stéphane Belmondo (Impulse!, 2016)
 53 (Blue Note, 2019)

As sideman 

With Cindy Blackman
 In the Now (Highnote, 1998) – recorded in 1997
 Telepathy (Muse, 1994)

With Ry Cooder
 Music from the Motion Picture Primary Colors (MCA, 1998)
 Chavez Ravine (Nonesuch, 2005)
 My Name Is Buddy (Nonesuch, 2007)

With Philippe Gaillot
 Be Cool (Ilona, 2018)
 CassIstanmbul (That Sound, 2022)

With Javon Jackson
 When the Time Is Right (Blue Note, 1994) - recorded in 1993
 For One Who Knows (Blue Note, 1995)

With others
 Stefano di Battista, Stefano di Battista (Blue Note, 2000)
 Ray Brown, Ray Brown's New Two Bass Hits (Capri, 1992) – recorded in 1991
 Jesse Davis, As We Speak (Concord Jazz, 1992)
 Eddie Harris, Freedom Jazz Dance (Venus, 1994)
 Jon Hassell, Fascinoma (Water Lily Acoustics, 1999)
 Irvin Mayfield and Jaz Sawyer, Live at the Blue Note (Half Note, 2000) – live
 Leon Parker, Above and Below (Epicure, 1994)
 Dianne Reeves, Quiet After the Storm (Blue Note, 1994)
 Antoine Roney, The Traveler (Muse, 1994)
 Wallace Roney, Seth Air (Muse, 1991)
 Jimmy Scott, Heaven (Warner Bros., 1996)
 Art Taylor, Wailin' at the Vanguard (Verve, 1993) – live recorded in 1992

References

External links
Official website
[ All Music]

Post-bop pianists
Berklee College of Music alumni
African-American jazz musicians
American jazz pianists
American male pianists
American people of French descent
French jazz pianists
German jazz pianists
1966 births
Living people
Musicians from Berlin
Blue Note Records artists
20th-century American pianists
21st-century American pianists
20th-century American male musicians
21st-century American male musicians
American male jazz musicians
African-American pianists
20th-century African-American musicians
21st-century African-American musicians